Gerard van Bylaer (1553–1617) was a Dutch medallist active in Dordrecht, Middelburg and Harderwijk.

Van Bylaer was born in Barneveld to a family of printers. His brother Wolfaert became a jeweler in Amsterdam and he settled in Dordrecht as a medallist. His sons Jacob and Willem followed in his footsteps as medallists and Willem later became mint master in Dordrecht. He is known for his jetons and medals commemorating various national events of his time.

References 

 collection of archival notes on genealogy website
 collection of archival notes on ECARTICO website

1553 births
1617 deaths
People from Dordrecht
Dutch medallists